Edurmaneli Ganda Pakkadmaneli Hendthi is a 1992 Indian Kannada-language comedy drama film directed by Relangi Narasimha Rao and produced by P. Balaram. A remake of Rao's Telugu film, Edurinti Mogudu Pakkinti Pellam (1991), the film featured Shashikumar, Shruti and Master Adithya.  The film's music was composed by Raj–Koti and cinematography is by Sharath.

Plot
Bagalkote Vasudevarao (BaVa) is a big miser and marries Jaya, who likes to lead a normal and enjoyable life. Due to her husband's constant miserly attitude in everyday life and a publicly embarrassing event, she leaves the house being pregnant. After a few years she rents a house which unknowingly for her is right next to that of her estranged husband's house. she is living with her now school going kid, who seems to have inherited all the stingy qualities of his father. The child gets closer to his father with everyday interactions which makes his mother Jaya much worried and leads to her shifting to a new house. Meanwhile, Bava's mother, who was angry with him because of his marriage against her will, gets to know he has left his wife. She joins as a maid in Jaya's house to spend time with Jaya and her grandson. Eventually, Jaya discovers the maid is none other than her mother-in-law and feels bad for treating her as a maid. Bava and Jaya's Nepali Boss Rekha (who is known for her hilarious Malapropisms, much to the discomfort of her colleagues), a kind-hearted lady, concocts a plan to rid of Bava's stinginess  leading to a situation where Bava is admitted to the hospital and he is made to believe that he has an incurable brain tumor and very little time to live. As per these plan of events Bava's view towards money and family is changed and unites him with his family. In the end, Rekha reveals the plot and the movie ends on a happy note.

Cast 
 Shashikumar as Bava alias Bagalkote Vasudeva rao 
 Shruti as Jayakumari 
 Mukhyamantri Chandru As Turuvekere Nethrappa
 Umashree as Kanakaveni, a novelist 
 Mysore Lokesh as Huchchaiah 
 Master Adithya as Anand alias Aa / Stampu
 M. S. Umesh as Thippayya 
 Bangalore Nagesh as Sandeharao 
 Annapoorna as Bava's mother 
 Rekha Das as Municipality Commissioner Rekha Koirala 
 Manju Malini as Bala kumari

Soundtrack 
The music of the film was composed by Raj–Koti with lyrics by R. N. Jayagopal.

References 

1992 films
1990s Kannada-language films
Indian comedy-drama films
1992 comedy-drama films
Kannada remakes of Telugu films
Films scored by Raj–Koti
Films directed by Relangi Narasimha Rao